= Om Prakash Srivastava (judge) =

Indian judge

Om Prakash Srivastava (born 10 June 1945) is an Indian jurist who served as a permanent judge of the Allahabad High Court from 2002 to 2007. Following his regular retirement, he was recalled to the court from September 2007 to August 2008 under Article 224A of the Constitution of India for continuity in the Ayodhya civil title litigation.

== Education ==
He graduated in law from the University of Lucknow in 1967.

== Judicial career ==
Srivastava entered the Uttar Pradesh Provincial Civil Service (Judicial) in 1970 and was promoted to the Higher Judicial Service in 1981. He served in administrative legal posts as Joint Secretary (Law) at the Uttar Pradesh Public Service Commission in Allahabad from April 1985 to July 1989, and as Joint Secretary and Joint Legal Remembrancer to the Government of Uttar Pradesh in Lucknow from August 1989 to August 1994.

He subsequently served as District and Sessions Judge in Nainital from April 1995 to July 1997, in Agra from July 1997 to August 1999, and in Meerut from August 1999 until his elevation to the High Court. Appointed a permanent judge of the Allahabad High Court on 5 July 2002, he held office until his regular retirement on 9 June 2007.

== Ayodhya proceedings ==
At the Allahabad High Court, Srivastava was a member of the bench hearing the civil title litigation concerning the disputed site in Ayodhya. On 17 January 2007, a three-judge bench comprising S. R. Alam, Bhanwar Singh, and Srivastava directed the Archaeological Survey of India to refill 26 remaining excavation trenches at the site and ordered authorities to produce earlier correspondence.

In August 2007, President Pratibha Patil approved Srivastava's post-retirement recall for one year from assumption of office, or until disposal of the litigation, whichever occurred earlier, to preserve continuity in the hearings. He served this term from 1 September 2007 to 31 August 2008.

In Lok Prahari v. Union of India (20 April 2021), the Supreme Court noted Srivastava's 2007 recall as one of three historical uses of Article 224A documented up to that point, alongside Suraj Bhan and P. Venugopal.
